Volgadraco ("Volga River dragon") is a genus of pterodactyloid pterosaur from the Upper Cretaceous of European Russia. Volgadraco was originally classified as an azhdarchid.  However, recent studies have concluded that it may belong to either the family Nyctosauridae, or the family Pteranodontidae.

Volgadraco is known from lower beak (holotype SGU, no. 46/104a) and postcranial fragments from the early Campanian-age Rybushka Formation of Saratov, Russia. The size of this animal, and the development of blood supply in the lower jaw are intermediate between older Santonian or Turonian azhdarchids like Azhdarcho and Bakonydraco and later Maastrichtian azhdarchids like Quetzalcoatlus.  Volgadraco was described in 2008 by Averianov, Arkhangelsky, and Pervushov.  The type species is V. bogolubovi, the specific name honouring Russian paleontologist Nikolai Nikolaevich Bogolubov. The authors consider the earlier named genus Bogolubovia to be a nomen dubium that in fact might be identical to Volgadraco; their conclusions are refuted by a 2022 paper, which considers both Volgadraco and Bogolubovia to both be valid pteranodontids.

Phylogeny
The cladogram below shows the phylogenetic analysis published by Nicholas Longrich and colleagues in 2018. While Volgadraco has been recovered as either an azhdarchid or pteranodontid in some analysis, Longrich and colleagues had recovered it within the family Nyctosauridae instead.

See also
 Timeline of pterosaur research
 List of pterosaurs

References

Ornithocheiroids
Late Cretaceous pterosaurs of Europe
Fossil taxa described in 2008